A swamp is a wooded wetland.

Swamp or The Swamp may also refer to:

Books and comics
 Swamp (comic strip), a comic strip by Gary Clark
 The Swamp, a 1976 book by Bill Thomas
The Swamp: The Everglades, Florida, and the Politics of Paradise, a 2006 book by Michael Grunwald

Film and television
 The Swamp (1921 film), a silent film starring Sessue Hayakawa and Bessie Love
 The Swamp, a 2019 film produced by television series American Experience
 The Swamp (documentary), a 2020 documentary film by HBO
 The Swamp (Ireland), a 1996–1998 summer replacement for the television series The Den on RTÉ
 "The Swamp" (Avatar: The Last Airbender), a television episode
 The Swamp, a tent that was home to the main characters in the film MASH and television series M*A*S*H

Music
 Swamp music (disambiguation) or simply swamp, a type of American popular music
 The Swamp, a studio space associated with GWAR record label Slave Pit Inc.
 Swamp (album), by Phil Thornalley, 1988
 Swamp, an album by Partisans with Julian Siegel, 2014
 "Swamp" (song), by That Petrol Emotion, 1987
 "Swamp", a song by Brockhampton from Saturation II, 2017
 "Swamp", a song by Talking Heads from Speaking in Tongues, 1983
 "Swamp", a song by Telepopmusik from Angel Milk, 2005
 "The Swamp", a song by Gruff Rhys from American Interior, 2014

Acronyms
 Southern Waste Management Partnership, Northern Ireland, UK
 SouthWest Association of Mountain Bike Pedalers, a bike trail building organization in Tampa, Florida, U.S.

Places nicknamed The Swamp
 Ben Hill Griffin Stadium, the football stadium at the University of Florida in Gainesville
 Cajun Field, the football stadium at the University of Louisiana at Lafayette
 Cypress Lake (Lafayette, Louisiana), also on the UL Lafayette campus
 Giants Stadium, a football stadium near New York City from 1976 to 2010
 The Swamp (LSUS), the soccer stadium at Louisiana State University Shreveport

See also
 
 Swamp Creek (disambiguation)
 La Cienega (disambiguation)
Drain the swamp, an idiom of political rhetoric